An inset day (an abbreviation of in-service training day), also known as a TD day (teacher development day), PD day (professional development day) or Baker day, is one of a series of five days in most schools in the United Kingdom on which teaching sessions are not run and the pupils do not attend school,  but the staff are required to attend for training or to complete administrative tasks.  Teachers can catch up with work and also have the opportunity to train for any new technology or new ways of doing things within the school.

History
Inset days were introduced in 1988 under a Conservative government by the minister Kenneth Baker, as part of a series of reforms, including the introduction of the National Curriculum.  They were originally referred to as Baker days, because Kenneth Baker introduced the requirement for teachers to attend training in addition to the 190 days previously required.

Attendance
Teachers in state schools are required to undertake five inset days in addition to the 190 teaching days children are required to be in school. The days are determined by the local education authority, although academy and free schools have the freedom to set their own dates.

Controversy
This development of teacher training days is thought by some education bodies to cause additional disruption and burdens on working parents who do not have easy access to flexible childcare, although the five training days were introduced as an addition to teachers' attendance days and the total number of days children are required to be in school was not affected.

Teachers who are parents themselves may have greater problems than other working parents since they are unable to take ad-hoc days off to look after their own children whenever an inset day is scheduled at their children's school.

See also
 In-service program

References

Teacher training programs
Education in England
Education in Northern Ireland
Education in Wales